Elodie Guiglion (born 28 January 1990) is a French rugby union player. She represented  at the 2014 Women's Rugby World Cup. She was selected as a member of the France women's national rugby sevens team to the 2016 Summer Olympics.

References

External links
 

1990 births
Living people
Sportspeople from Hyères
French female rugby union players
Rugby sevens players at the 2016 Summer Olympics
Olympic rugby sevens players of France
France international rugby sevens players
Female rugby sevens players
France international women's rugby sevens players